Colonel Sir Guy Theophilus Halswell Campbell, 5th Baronet OBE, MC (18 January 1910 – 19 July 1993) was a British soldier.  Sir Guy's branch of the Campbell baronets, of St Cross Mede, were created in 1815 with Sir Guy Campbell, 1st Baronet.

Background
He was the eldest son of Sir Guy Colin Campbell, 4th Baronet and his first wife Mary Arabella Swinnerton Kemeys-Tynte, daughter of Halswell Milborne Kemeys-Tynte. In 1960, he succeeded his father as baronet. Campbell was educated at St. Aubyns Preparatory School, Rottingdean, Eton College and the University of St Andrews.

Career
Campbell was commissioned into the King's Own Yorkshire Light Infantry in 1932. With the outbreak of the Second World War in 1939, he was attached to the Camel Corps of the Sudan Defence Force, commanding the 2nd and 7th Nuba Battalions. Serving in Abyssinia, he was wounded and received the Military Cross in 1941. A year later he was promoted to captain and in 1945, he acted as brigadier in the Force's headquarter. Campbell was sent to the British embassy in Cairo as adviser to Ralph Bunche and to Folke Bernadotte in 1948 and subsequently was despatched to Ethiopia, where he was awarded a gold medal by Emperor Haile Selassie. In 1951, he was transferred to the King's Royal Rifle Corps.

He was appointed to command the Kenya Regiment at the beginning of the Mau Mau Uprising in 1952. Campbell was made an Officer of the Order of the British Empire and was promoted to lieutenant-colonel in 1954. After another two years he was appointed head of the military mission in Libya until 1960. He was put on the reserve list in August and was granted an honorary colonelship. Five years later, having reached the age limit, he retired.

Family
On 17 August 1956, he married the musical comedy star Lizbeth Webb (whose real name was Elizabeth Holton). They had two sons:  Lachlan Philip Kemeys Campbell, an artist and illustrator (Eton Colours, When It Happened in Scotland, and When It Happened in Britain), born in 1958, who has three children, Archie, Georgia and Ivo; and Rory Charles Fitzgerald Campbell, an opera singer and actor who owns the entertainment company Encore Management Ltd., born in 1961, who has a daughter, Olivia.

When Campbell died at the age of 83, he was succeeded in the baronetcy by his elder son Lachlan.

Works
The Charging Buffalo: A History of the Kenyan Regiment 1937–1963 (1986, Leo Cooper)

References

1910 births
1993 deaths
Alumni of the University of St Andrews
Baronets in the Baronetage of the United Kingdom
British Army brigadiers of World War II
British military personnel of the Mau Mau Uprising
King's Royal Rifle Corps officers
Officers of the Order of the British Empire
People educated at Eton College
Recipients of the Military Cross
Kenya Regiment officers
People educated at St. Aubyns School
King's Own Yorkshire Light Infantry officers